Brumwell is a surname. Notable people with the surname include:

George Brumwell (1939 – 2005), British trade unionist
Murray Brumwell (born 1960), Canadian ice hockey player
Phil Brumwell (born 1975), English footballer
Su Brumwell, British architect and founding member of Team 4